Get Wet is the debut studio album released by Australian band, Mental As Anything. It was released in November 1979, and peaked at #19 on the Australian Album charts. 

Mombassa said the band's goal was, "Getting an album out that was reasonably like us. We had no great plans of what it should sound like although that was probably a bad idea as it should've sounded better. But it was done hastily and it's not a bad album."

Track listing 
Side A
 "The Nips Are Getting Bigger" (Written: Plaza, Vocal: Plaza)
 "Spanish Gardener" (Written: Plaza, Vocal: Plaza)
 "Business and Pleasure" (Written: Reg Mombassa, Vocals: Mombassa)
 "Sheilah" (Written: Plaza, Vocal: Plaza)
 "Possible Theme for a Future TV Drama Series" (Written: Plaza, Vocal: Plaza)
 "Talk to Baby Jesus" (Written: Mombassa, Vocals: Mombassa)
 "Egypt" (Written: Mombassa, Vocals: Mombassa/Plaza)

Side B
 "Another Man's Sitting in My Kitchen" (Written: Greedy Smith, Vocal: Smith)
 "Can I Come Home?" (Written: Mombassa, Vocal: Mombassa)
 "Fringe Benefits" (Written: Plaza, Vocal: Plaza)
 "Insurance Man" (Written: Smith, Vocal: Smith)
 "Empty Hearts/Open Wounds" (Written: Mombassa, Vocal: Mombassa)
 "Love Is Not a Gift" (titled "Pork Is Not a Gift" on some versions) (Written: Peter O'Doherty, Vocal: O'Doherty)
 "Wolf at Your Door" (Written: O'Doherty, Vocal: Plaza)

Personnel

Musicians
 Martin Plaza — lead vocals, guitar    
 Greedy Smith — lead vocals, keyboards, harmonica
 Reg Mombassa — guitar, vocals  
 Peter O'Doherty — bass, guitar, vocals 
 Wayne de Lisle – drums

Recording details
 Cameron Allan — Producer
 Heather Dalton — Engineer
 Spencer Lee — Engineer
Ted Jensen at Sterling Sound, NYC - Mastering

Charts

Certifications and sales

Release history

References

1979 debut albums
Mental As Anything albums
Virgin Records albums
Regular Records albums